Metaplexis is a genus of flowering plants in the family Apocynaceae, first described as a genus in 1810. As presently conceived, it contains two known species, both native to east Asia.

Description
Metaplexis plants are vines that reach 8 m high; are rhizomatous and have underground woody organs that constitute a pattern. Leaf-blades are herbaceous, about 5–10 cm long and 4.6 cm wide, ovate, basally cordate, acute apex attenuated, adaxial glabrous and are abaxially sparsely pubescent.

The inflorescences are extra-axillary, solitary, almost as long as the adjacent leaves. The plants have 6-20 flowers, simple, with the peduncle longer than the pedicels which are practically obsolete and slightly pubescent on the whole surface.

Species
 Metaplexis hemsleyana Oliv. - China (Guangxi, Guizhou, Hubei, Hunan, Jiangxi, Shaanxi, Sichuan, Yunnan)
 Metaplexis japonica Makino - widespread across much of China; also Korea, Japan, Russian Far East

formerly included
 Metaplexis cavaleriei, syn of Marsdenia cavaleriei  
 Metaplexis fimbriata, syn of Matelea cumanensis

References

Asclepiadoideae
Flora of China
Flora of Eastern Asia
Flora of the Russian Far East
Apocynaceae genera